Maftivimab is a Zaire ebolavirus glycoprotein-directed human monoclonal antibody that is part of the fixed-dose combination atoltivimab/maftivimab/odesivimab that is used for the treatment of Zaire ebolavirus (Ebola virus).

References

External links 
 
 

Ebola
Monoclonal antibodies